Bradford College is a college in the city of Bradford, England

Bradford College may also refer to:

Bradford College (United States), a now-defunct college in Haverhill, Massachusetts
Bradford College (Australia), a college at the  University of Adelaide in Adelaide, Australia

See also
University of Bradford